Nevada is the sixteenth richest state in the United States of America, with a per capita income of $21,989 (2000) and a personal per capita income of $31,266 (2003).

Nevada counties and cities ranked by per capita income

Note: Data is from the 2010 United States Census Data and the 2006-2010 American Community Survey 5-Year Estimates.

Nevada places ranked by per capita income

References

United States locations by per capita income
Economy of Nevada
Income